Metroxylon paulcoxii is a species of palm endemic to Samoa. It is reported there from the islands of 'Upolu and Savai'i. The species is named in honor of ethnobotanist Paul Alan Cox.

Leaves are pinnately compound, with spines on the sheaths, petioles, and leaf margins. Inflorescences have second-order branching, with as many as 450 flowers per branch.

The species is similar to M. warburgii (also present in Samoa), but with shorter leaflets and with second-order branching in the inflorescence instead of third-order.

References

External links
 

Flora of Samoa
paulcoxii
Plants described in 1998